Silverquant is a labeling and detection method for DNA microarrays or protein microarrays. A synonym is <colorimetric> detection.
In contrast to the classical signal detection on microarrays by using fluorescence, the colorimetric detection is more sensitive and ozone-stable.

Chemical reaction
The probe to be detected is labeled with some biotin-molecules. After incubation with a gold-coupled anti-biotin conjugate,  silver nitrate and a reducing agent are added. The reaction starts whereas the gold particle serves as a starting point for the silver precipitation.
The reaction needs to be stopped after a specific time. The constant reaction time is essential to obtain comparable results.

Detection
The silver-stained spots on the microarray are clearly visible. By using a transmission microarray scanner, the signals are transformed into digital values which are finally available as an image file.

References
Alexandre I et al. Anal Biochem. 2001 Aug 1;295(1):1-8.

Gene expression
Bioinformatics
DNA
Microarrays